Below is a list of drugs granted breakthrough therapy designation (BTD) by the Food and Drug Administration (FDA).

Drugs may be listed more than once as BTD can be awarded for multiple indications.

2020 

D-PLEX 100 || PolyPid Ltd|| Prevention of Surgical Site Infections (SSI)

2019

2018

2017

2016

2015

2014

2013

References

Breakthrough therapy